Warren Batchelder (April 18, 1917 – February 12, 2007) was an animator on many Warner Bros. and DePatie-Freleng cartoons. He also worked as animation director on the Dungeons and Dragons cartoon show., He also did the animation for the Peanuts TV Special in 1976 It's Arbor Day, Charlie Brown and he also did the animation for the Peanuts Movie in 1977 Race for Your Life, Charlie Brown, although he was uncredited.

Career
Batchelder began his animation career in 1936. At Warner Bros., he animated for Bob Clampett and Robert McKimson and became a master animator (eligible for on-screen credit) in 1958.

In 1987 he received the Animation Guild Golden Award, and retired in 2002.

References

External links

1917 births
2007 deaths
Animators from California
American animated film directors
Artists from Los Angeles
Warner Bros. Cartoons people